Gevhermüluk Sultan, "gem of the king", was an ottoman Sultana. She was the daughter of Bayezid II.

Early life 

Alderson notes,referring to Ulucay, that Şehzade Mahmud and Gevhermüluk Sultan were full brother and sister.

She married Dukakinzade Mehmed Pasha, son of Grand Vizier Dukakinzade Ahmed Pasha,governor of Smederevo, Kyustendil, Karaman and finally Allepo. He died in 1557. Their son was Sultanzade Dukakinzade Mehmed Ahmed Bey (died 1537) and their daughter was Neslişah Hanımsultan (1507–1579), who had built her own mosque in 1522 named after her. Ahmed Bey was known as a Divan poet who married Hanzade Ayşe Mihrihan Hanımsultan, daughter of his aunt Ayşe Sultan. Neslişah Hanimsultan married Iskender Pasha and after his cousin Dukaginzade Ibrahim Pasha (died 1582, son of Ayşe Sultan and grandson of Bayezid II; and of Dukakinoğlu Ahmed Pasha, Neslişah's grandfather).

Death 
Gevhermüluk Sultan was one of the longest-lived Sultanas. She died on January 20,1550 in Istanbul. Her son-in-law built a school near Zal Mahmud Pasha's Mosque and the three of them are buried there.

References 

1467 births
1550 deaths